John A. Anderson may refer to:

 John A. Anderson (American football) (1933–1998), college football coach
 John A. Anderson (Oregon politician), member of the Oregon Territorial Legislature, 1851
 John Alexander Anderson (1834–1892), Representative from Kansas
 John August Anderson (1876–1959), physicist/astronomer
John Alvin Anderson (1869–1948), photographer and maker of Indian views

See also
John Anderson (disambiguation)